Zammit is a Maltese and Tunisian surname. Notable people with the surname include:
 Aidan Zammit (born 1965), Maltese musician
 Alfredo Cachia Zammit (1890–1960), Maltese politician
Alexander Zammit (born 1962), Maltese wrestler
 Carmelo Zammit (born 1949), Maltese Roman Catholic prelate and Bishop of Gibraltar
Charlene Zammit, Maltese footballer
 Daniel Zammit-Lewis, Maltese squash player
Darrin Zammit Lupi, Maltese photographer and photojournalist
Edward Zammit Lewis, Maltese politician
Francis Zammit Dimech, Maltese politician
 Frederick Zammit, Maltese TV writer
 Ivan Zammit, Maltese footballer
Joseph Zammit, Australian wrestler
Joseph Zammit McKeon, Maltese judge
Liam Zammit, Australian cricketer
Lou Drofenik, (born Lou Zammit, 1941), Maltese-Australian novelist and academic
 Louis Rees-Zammit (born 2001), Welsh rugby union player
Michael Zammit (born 1954), Maltese philosopher
 Michael Zammit Tabona, Maltese entrepreneur
Nicholas Zammit, Maltese philosopher 
 Ninu Zammit, Maltese politician
Olga Zammitt, Mayor of Gibraltar
 Paul Zammit, Australian politician
 Paul Zammit (footballer), Maltese footballer and manager
Rita Incerti (aka Rita Zammit), Australian judge
 Robert Zammit, Australian veterinarian and TV personality
Shona Zammit, Maltese footballer
 Stephanie Zammit, former Miss Malta
 Sir Themistocles Zammit, Maltese archeologist, historian and medical doctor

Maltese-language surnames